Vincent Adams (born 26 January 1950) is a retired Guyanese-American environmental engineer. He was a senior manager at the United States Department of Energy until his retirement in 2016. Before immigrating to the United States he played first-class cricket for Guyana.

Early life and education
Adams was born on 26 January 1950 in Good Intent, British Guiana.

Adams was one of the first civil engineering graduates from the University of Guyana. After moving to the United States he completed master's degrees in hydrogeology and petroleum and geological engineering, followed by a doctorate in environmental engineering at the University of Tennessee.

Sporting activities
He made his first-class cricket debut for Guyana in 1969 at the age of 19. He played five matches as an opening batsman, with a highest score of 121. His cricket career was cut short by a car accident.

In 2016, Adams was appointed by the International Cricket Council (ICC) to a new national advisory group created to advise on the growth and development of cricket in the United States. Following the ICC's expulsion of the United States of America Cricket Association (USACA) in 2017, he was involved with the creation of a new body, USA Cricket, which was readmitted to ICC membership. He was appointed to the USA Cricket Committee in August 2020.

Career
Adams joined the United States Department of Energy (DOE) in 1986, working in West Texas as a hydrogeologist with the Office of Civilian Radioactive Waste Management. After two years he joined the Formerly Utilized Sites Remedial Action Program in Tennessee as an environmental engineer. He later had a longstanding involvement with the DOE's Office of Environmental Management, notably serving as director of deactivation and decommissioning for the K-25 plant at Oak Ridge.

In 2007, Adams became director of DOE's Groundwater and Soils Office. He oversaw the billion-dollar Recovery Act program at the Savannah River Site and later had responsibility for the Paducah and Portsmouth Gaseous Diffusion Plants. He retired from the department in December 2016.

See also
 List of Guyanese representative cricketers

References

External links
 

1950 births
Living people
Guyanese cricketers
Guyana cricketers
Guyanese emigrants to the United States
University of Tennessee alumni
University of Guyana alumni
Hydrogeologists
Environmental engineers
United States Department of Energy officials